The State of Lincoln (named after Abraham Lincoln) was proposed in 1869 after the American Civil War to be carved out of the territory of Texas from the area south and west of the state's Colorado River. Unlike many other Texas division proposals of the Reconstruction period, this one was presented to Congress, but like the others it failed.

See also
Jefferson (proposed Southern state)
Lincoln (proposed Northwestern state)
Texas divisionism

References

External links

Proposed states and territories of the United States
Texas border disputes